Beaverdam is an unincorporated community in Wirt County, West Virginia, United States.  Its elevation is 666 feet (203 m).

References

Unincorporated communities in Wirt County, West Virginia
Unincorporated communities in West Virginia